Ryania is a genus of flowering plants in the family Salicaceae; it was previously listed in the now defunct family Flacourtiaceae.

The genus is significant partly because the ryanoid insecticides are derived from, and have the same mode of action as the alkaloid ryanodine, which was originally extracted from Ryania speciosa.

The Catalogue of Life includes these species:
 Ryania angustifolia
 Ryania canescens
 Ryania dentata
 Ryania mansoana
 Ryania pyrifera
 Ryania riedeliana
 Ryania sauricida
 Ryania speciosa
 Ryania spruceana

References

External links 
 
 

Salicaceae
Salicaceae genera